Sudhin is a given name. Notable people with the name include:

 Sudhin Choksey (born 1954), Indian banking executive
 Sudhin Das (1930–2017), Bangladeshi musician
 Sudhin Dasgupta (1929–1982), Indian music director, lyricist, and singer
 Sudhin Datta (born 1951), Indian scientist

See also
 Sudhir